Church of the Holy Spirit is a Gothic church in Josefov, Prague, Czech Republic.

References

Churches in Prague
Gothic architecture in the Czech Republic